Upper Musquodoboit is a forestry and farming community in the northeastern reaches of the Musquodoboit Valley, Nova Scotia, Canada within the Halifax Regional Municipality,   from Downtown Halifax. The community is located along the Musquodoboit River. Upper Musquodoboit is situated at the junction of Route 336 with Route 224.

Upper Musquodoboit Elementary School is the only school in the community. It teaches grades primary through six, and was built in 1962. As of 2017, there are 27 students enrolled in the school. For children who are grade seven or higher, they go to Musquodoboit Rural High School (MRHS) for school. Upper Musquodoboit also has a convenience store, an auto-body shop and a limestone mine.

References

Communities in Halifax, Nova Scotia
General Service Areas in Nova Scotia